The Cantabrians (Cantabrian and ) are an ethnic group who inhabit the autonomous community of Cantabria, in northern Spain. Sometimes they are referred to as "montañeses" (meaning Highlanders). The traditional dialects in this region, known as Cantabru or Montañés, are related to the Astur-Leonese languages.

References

See also
Cantabri
Cantabria
Cantabrian language
Duchy of Cantabria
Kingdom of Asturias
Crown of Castile
Nationalities of Spain

 
Romance peoples
Ethnic groups in Spain